Fakhreddin Azimi is a professor of history at the University of Connecticut.

Selected publications
The Quest for Democracy in Iran: a Century of Struggle against Authoritarian Rule (Cambridge, Mass.: Harvard University Press, 2008); 
Iran: The Crisis of Democracy, 1941-53 (New York & London 1989); revised paperback edition in process;

References

20th-century Iranian historians
Living people
Date of birth missing (living people)
University of Connecticut faculty
Iranian expatriate academics
Iranian emigrants to the United States
21st-century American historians
21st-century American male writers
Year of birth missing (living people)
American male non-fiction writers